Time to Think is a live album by Mo Foster. Most of the tracks were written while Foster was on a trip to New Zealand. The album was conceived as a soundscape of acoustic instruments and to that end was recorded in a small Oxfordshire church that was chosen for its acoustics.

Track listing 
 "Its About That Time of Day" – 5:29
 "Leo" – 5:37
 "Omapere Dawn" – 4:35
 "On Frith Street" – 5:42
 "Mangonui" – 6:27
 "Guardians" – 5:59
 "Waves II" – 1:48
 "Shades of Grey" – 3:49
 "Let's Go On Somewhere" – 5:38
 "The Long Man of Wilmington" – 6:16
 "A Notional Anthem" – 5:05
 "Time to Think" – 3:32

Personnel
 Mo Foster – bass guitar, fretless bass, five-string bass
 Iain Ballamy – soprano saxophone
 Simon Chamberlain - piano, church organ
 Ray Russell – acoustic guitar
 Frank Ricotti – vibraphone, percussion

References

Mo Foster albums
2002 live albums